In May 2016, President Francois Hollande announced the formation of a foundation to erect a national slavery and Atlantic slave trade memorial and museum ("un musée de l'esclavage") in Paris, France.  Identifying the memorial and museum's purpose, Hollande said, “I wish to give to France an institution it still lacks, a foundation for the memory of the slave trade, slavery and its abolition”.

See also
Code Noir
International Slavery Museum
Whitney Plantation Historic District (USA)
Mémorial ACTe (Guadeloupe, France)

References

Further reading
Hollande inaugurates world's largest slavery memorial in French West Indies Agence France-Presse. May 10, 2015.

External links
 Slavery and Remembrance: French Slave Trade, UNESCO and The Colonial Williamsburg Foundation

Museums in Paris
Proposed museums
Slavery museums